The , officially the , are a Japanese women's softball team based in Toda, Saitama. The Medics compete in the Japan Diamond Softball League (JD.League) as a member of the league's East Division.

History
The Medics were founded in 1976, as Toda Chuo Hospital softball team.

The Japan Diamond Softball League (JD.League) was founded in 2022, and the Medics became part of the new league as a member of the East Division.

Roster

References

External links
 
 Toda Medics - JD.League

Japan Diamond Softball League
Women's softball teams in Japan
Sports teams in Saitama Prefecture